Mordellochroa hasegawai is a beetle in the genus Mordellochroa of the family Mordellidae. It was described in 1959 by Nomura & Kato.

References

Mordellidae
Beetles described in 1959